Makhfuza Turapova is an Uzbekistani women's football midfielder.

International goals

See also
List of Uzbekistan women's international footballers

External links 
 

Year of birth missing (living people)
Living people
Women's association football midfielders
Uzbekistani women's footballers
Uzbekistan women's international footballers
Uzbekistani women's futsal players
21st-century Uzbekistani women